Golekane Mosveu (born 16 August 1948) is a Botswana long-distance runner. He competed in the men's 10,000 metres at the 1980 Summer Olympics.

References

External links
 

1948 births
Living people
Athletes (track and field) at the 1980 Summer Olympics
Botswana male long-distance runners
Olympic athletes of Botswana
Commonwealth Games competitors for Botswana
Athletes (track and field) at the 1974 British Commonwealth Games
Athletes (track and field) at the 1986 Commonwealth Games
Place of birth missing (living people)